John Bagni (December 24, 1910 – February 13, 1954) was an American actor and a writer for radio and television.

He often worked with his wife Gwen Bagni. Their collaborations included scripts for Douglas Fairbanks Presents.

Filmography

Selected screenwriting
Four Star Playhouse (1952-1954)

References

1910 births
1954 deaths
American male actors
20th-century American screenwriters